Encyclia cyperifolia is a species of orchid found in South America.

References

External links 

cyperifolia
Orchids of South America